Aliaksandra Sasnovich was the defending champion, but she chose to participate at the 2015 Open Féminin de Marseille instead.

Stephanie Vogt won the title, defeating qualifier Andrea Gámiz in the final, 7–6(7–3), 6–4.

Seeds

Main draw

Finals

Top half

Bottom half

References 
 Main draw

Internazionali Femminili di Brescia - Singles